Clithon faba is a species of brackish water snail with an operculum, a nerite. It is an aquatic gastropod mollusc in the family Neritidae, the nerites.

Distribution 
This species occurs in the Philippines, Singapore and in Japan: Honshū and Kyūshū, Vietnam.

References

 Chin, I. M. (2003). Variation in Monodonta labio among different intertidal habitats in Hong Kong. PhD thesis. The University of Hong Kong
 Eichhorst T.E. (2016). Neritidae of the world. Volume 1. Harxheim: Conchbooks. 695 pp
 Liu, J.Y. [Ruiyu] (ed.). (2008). Checklist of marine biota of China seas. China Science Press. 1267 pp.

External links
 Sowerby, G. B., I; Sowerby, G. B., II. (1832-1841). The conchological illustrations or, Coloured figures of all the hitherto unfigured recent shells. London,
 Martens, E. von. (1863-1879). Die Gattung Neritina. In: Küster, H. C.; Kobelt, W., Weinkauff, H. C., Eds. Systematisches Conchylien-Cabinet von Martini und Chemnitz. Neu herausgegeben und vervollständigt. Zweiten Bandes zehnte Abtheilung. 1-303, pls 
 Récluz, C. A. (1843). Descriptions of new species of Nerites, collected by Mr. Cuming in the Philippine Islands. Proceedings of the Zoological Society of London. (1842) 10: 168-176.
 Sowerby, G. B., II. (1849). Monograph of the genus Neritina. In G. B. Sowerby II (ed.), Thesaurus conchyliorum, or monographs of genera of shells. Vol. 2 (10): 507-546, pls. 109–116. London
 Récluz, C. A. (1850). Description de Néritines nouvelles citées dans le Catalogue. Journal de Conchyliologie. 1: 154-164

Neritidae
Gastropods described in 1836